Judith Smilg Kleinfeld is a professor of psychology at the University of Alaska Fairbanks, and co-chairs the Northern Studies department.

A controversial academician, her most well known works are the ones criticizing studies on alleged discrimination in educational settings. Her The Myth That Schools Shortchange Girls analyzed  the American Association of University Women's report How Schools Shortchange Girls. Kleinfeld's analysis was first publicized at the Women's Freedom Network, received national attention and was covered by The New York Times and The Wall Street Journal.

She has also criticized a 1999 MIT study that supported claims made by some of the university's female professors that their male colleagues enjoyed preferential treatment despite their level of accomplishments. Kleinfeld called the MIT study "junk science" and pointed out that the committee evaluating the charges was led by the primary complainant and cited the committee's reluctance to open its data to peer review.

Judith Kleinfeld is a member at the Women's Freedom Network and the Independent Women's Forum. She is also director at The Boys Project, a not-for-profit group formed to address the female-male gender gap in educational achievement.

She is married to judge Andrew Kleinfeld. Her family is Jewish.

References

External links
 From Alaskan Outpost, Judith Kleinfeld Looks Down on Higher Education
 Home Page
 http://www.nationalreview.com/comment/kleinfeldkleinfeld200309240830.asp

Living people
Year of birth missing (living people)
21st-century American Jews
21st-century American psychologists
21st-century American women
American women academics
American women psychologists
Jewish American academics
People from Fairbanks, Alaska
University of Alaska Fairbanks faculty